The United Nations Framework Convention on Climate Change (UNFCCC or FCCC) is an international environmental treaty negotiated at the United Nations Conference on Environment and Development (UNCED), informally known as the Earth Summit, held in Rio de Janeiro from 3 to 14 June 1992. The objective of the treaty is to "stabilize greenhouse gas concentrations in the atmosphere at a level that would prevent dangerous anthropogenic interference with the climate system".

The treaty itself set no binding limits on greenhouse gas emissions for individual countries and contains no enforcement mechanisms. In that sense, the treaty is considered legally non-binding. Instead, the treaty provides a framework for negotiating specific international treaties (called "protocols") that may set binding limits on greenhouse gases.

The UNFCCC was opened for signature on 9 May 1992, after an Intergovernmental Negotiating Committee produced the text of the Framework Convention as a report following its meeting in New York from 30 April to 9 May 1992. It entered into force on 21 March 1994. As of July 2022, UNFCCC has 198 parties.

Parties 
As of 2022, the UNFCCC has 198 parties including all United Nations member states, United Nations General Assembly observers the State of Palestine and the Holy See, UN non-member states Niue and the Cook Islands, and the supranational union European Union.

Classification of Parties by the Annex 

Parties to the UNFCCC are classified as:

 Annex I: There are 43 Parties to the UNFCCC listed in Annex I of the convention, including the European Union.  These Parties are classified as industrialized (developed) countries and "economies in transition" (EITs).  The 14 EITs are the former centrally-planned (Soviet) economies of Russia and Eastern Europe.
 Annex II: Of the Parties listed in Annex I of the convention, 24 are also listed in Annex II of the convention, including the European Union.  These Parties are made up of members of the Organisation for Economic Co-operation and Development (OECD). Annex II Parties are required to provide financial and technical support to the EITs and developing countries to assist them in reducing their greenhouse gas emissions (climate change mitigation) and manage the impacts of climate change (climate change adaptation).
 Non-Annex I: Parties to the UNFCCC not listed in Annex I of the convention are mostly low-income developing countries. Developing countries may volunteer to become Annex I countries when they are sufficiently developed.
 Least-developed countries (LDCs): 49 Parties are LDCs, and are given special status under the treaty in view of their limited capacity to adapt to the effects of climate change.

Party negotiation groups 

Like minded parties group themselves in negotiation blocks, who oftentimes take common positions. 12 parties do not belong to any block.
 SIDS (Small Island Developing States)
 African Group
 LDCs (Least Developed Countries)
 G77 & China
 AILAC (Independent Alliance of Latin America and the Caribbean)
 LMDCs (Like-Minded Developing Countries)
 Arab Group
 EIG (Environmental Integrity Group)
 Umbrella Group
 EU (European Union)

List of parties

Notes and references

Notes

References 

United Nations Framework Convention on Climate Change
United Nations Framework Convention on Climate Change